Isola Florence Thompson (18 November 1861 – 8 December 1915) was an Australian educator. One of the first two women to graduate from the University of Sydney, she was the first to complete a Master of Arts at the same university.

Life and career 
Isola Florence Thompson was born in Newcastle, New South Wales on 18 November 1861. Her father, Joseph Thompson was headmaster there, before moving the family to Albury where he was again headmaster of the public school. She was successful in passing the Department of Public Instruction's entrance exam for teaching. On completing her schooling she was educated at home by her father and later by Mr C. A. Flint MA. In 1882, she was one of the first women to sit for and pass the matriculation examination. Three years later she and Mary Elizabeth Brown were the first two women to graduate from the University of Sydney with a bachelor of arts degree. On graduation she was employed by Sydney Girls High School as a teacher. She continued studying at the University of Sydney and graduated with a master of arts in 1887, the first woman to achieve this higher degree. 

Thompson remained on the staff of Sydney Girls High for 29 years, mainly in the role of first assistant (now deputy principal). She retired due to ill health in April 1914 and 400 former pupils of the school attended a presentation in her honour, including Dr Lucy Gullett and Ethel Turner.

Thompson died on 8 December 1915 in a private hospital in Stanmore, New South Wales. She was buried in Rookwood Cemetery.

An obituary by Jean in The Sydney Morning Herald, with the subheading "Kind and True", acknowledged Thompson as a "well-loved figure in school history" and noted:

A former pupil, M.W., wrote of how she "helped to mould the personalities of the hundreds of girls who passed through her hands" and remembered her kindness.

References 

1861 births
1915 deaths
University of Sydney alumni
Australian schoolteachers